Fernanda Aguirre (born 29 July 1999) is a Chilean taekwondo practitioner. She won one of the bronze medals in the women's 57 kg event at the 2019 Pan American Games held in Lima, Peru. In her bronze medal match she defeated Carolena Carstens of Panama.

In 2017, she competed in the women's lightweight event at the World Taekwondo Championships held in Muju, South Korea where she was eliminated in her first match by Kimia Alizadeh of Iran. In the same year, she also competed at the 2017 Summer Universiade held in Taipei, Taiwan without winning a medal. At the 2017 Bolivarian Games held in Santa Marta, Colombia, she won one of the bronze medals in the women's 57kg event. In 2018, she won one of the bronze medals in her event at the 2018 Pan American Taekwondo Championships held in Spokane, United States.

In 2019, she represented Chile at the Summer Universiade in Naples, Italy and she won one of the bronze medals in the women's 57kg event. She also won one of the bronze medals in her event at the 2021 Pan American Taekwondo Championships held in Cancún, Mexico.

She had qualified to represent Chile at the 2020 Summer Olympics in Tokyo, Japan but she had to withdraw due to a positive COVID-19 test. Nishy Lee Lindo of Costa Rica competed as her replacement in the women's 57 kg event.

References

External links 
 

Living people
1999 births
Place of birth missing (living people)
Chilean female taekwondo practitioners
Pan American Games medalists in taekwondo
Pan American Games bronze medalists for Chile
Medalists at the 2019 Pan American Games
Taekwondo practitioners at the 2019 Pan American Games
Competitors at the 2017 Summer Universiade
Medalists at the 2019 Summer Universiade
Universiade medalists in taekwondo
Universiade bronze medalists for Chile
21st-century Chilean women